Robert Arthur Weale (born in Hereford on 3 April 1963), is a Welsh international lawn and indoor bowls player. Weale is originally from Presteigne and was educated at John Beddoes School, but now lives in Hereford. In 2022, he was inducted into the Welsh Sports Hall of fame.

Bowls career
Weale made his international debut in 1982. He was the youngest competitor in the 1984 World Outdoor Bowls Championship in Aberdeen, where he competed in the triples event.

World Titles
Weale's career-best performance came in January 2000, when he won the 2000 World Indoor Bowls Championship singles title at Potters. Just a few months later, Weale won the men's fours title at the 2000 World Outdoor Bowls Championship, in April 2000.

Commonwealth Games
Weale has won six Commonwealth Games medals achieved from eight successive games, a record. The achievement of winning medals over eight games is a record for a lawn bowls player and equals the record for a competitor across all sports. Weale was given the honour of carrying the Welsh flag & led the Welsh team out at the 1998 opening ceremony and he carried the Welsh flag during the 2010 closing ceremony.

1986 Commonwealth Games in Edinburgh Gold Medal in the men's fours; with Jim Morgan, Hafod Thomas, and Will Thomas
1994 Commonwealth Games in Victoria silver medal in the men's pairs; with John Price
1998 Commonwealth Games in Kuala Lumpur silver medal in the men's pairs; with Will Thomas
2002 Commonwealth Games in Manchester bronze medal in the men's singles
2006 Commonwealth Games in Melbourne silver medal in the men's singles
2010 Commonwealth Games in Delhi gold medal in the men's singles. Weale defeated Australian, Leif Selby

Welsh Titles
Weale won his first Welsh National Bowls Championships singles in 2000 and subsequently won the singles at the British Isles Bowls Championships in 2001. He won his second Welsh singles title in 2005 before winning a third in August 2012, defeating Paul Taylor of Bridgend 21-11. He also skipped the Weale family quartet to the Welsh outdoor fours title, on eight occasions. The Weale bowling family includes his three brothers (all former national champions) Brian, David and Stuart, sister-in-law Joanna Weale and daughter Rhiannon.

He has also won the Welsh Indoor singles on three occasions. In August 2005, he created a record by becoming the only man to hold both titles simultaneously.

References

Living people
1963 births
Commonwealth Games medallists in lawn bowls
Commonwealth Games gold medallists for Wales
Commonwealth Games silver medallists for Wales
Commonwealth Games bronze medallists for Wales
Bowls players at the 1986 Commonwealth Games
Bowls players at the 1990 Commonwealth Games
Bowls players at the 1994 Commonwealth Games
Bowls players at the 1998 Commonwealth Games
Bowls players at the 2002 Commonwealth Games
Bowls players at the 2006 Commonwealth Games
Bowls players at the 2010 Commonwealth Games
Sportspeople from Hereford
People from Presteigne
Sportspeople from Powys
Welsh male bowls players
People educated at John Beddoes School
Indoor Bowls World Champions
Medallists at the 1986 Commonwealth Games
Medallists at the 1994 Commonwealth Games
Medallists at the 1998 Commonwealth Games
Medallists at the 2002 Commonwealth Games
Medallists at the 2006 Commonwealth Games
Medallists at the 2010 Commonwealth Games